The Bolsheviks Party of South Africa is a South African political party based in Limpopo.

It is campaigning for a more egalitarian society, and for the Moutse area to be transferred from Limpopo to Mpumalanga province.

The party competed in the 2016 Municipal election, winning three seats in the Elias Motsoaledi Local Municipality (part of the Sekhukhune District Municipality), and contested the 2019 general election in Limpopo province, failing to win a seat.

Election results

Provincial elections

! rowspan=2 | Election
! colspan=2 | Eastern Cape
! colspan=2 | Free State
! colspan=2 | Gauteng
! colspan=2 | Kwazulu-Natal
! colspan=2 | Limpopo
! colspan=2 | Mpumalanga
! colspan=2 | North-West
! colspan=2 | Northern Cape
! colspan=2 | Western Cape
|-
! % !! Seats
! % !! Seats
! % !! Seats
! % !! Seats
! % !! Seats
! % !! Seats
! % !! Seats
! % !! Seats
! % !! Seats
|-
! 2019
| - || -
| - || -
| - || -
| - || -
| 0.14% || 0/49
| - || -
| - || -
| - || -
| - || -
|}

Municipal elections

|-
! Election
! Votes
! %
|-
! 2016
| 9,632
| 0.02%
|-
! 2021
| 9,371
| 0.03%
|-
|}

References

Anti-racist organizations in Africa
Communist parties in South Africa
Political parties in South Africa
Political parties with year of establishment missing